1993 World Masters Athletics Championships is the tenth in a series of World Masters Athletics Outdoor Championships (called World Veterans Championships at the time) that took place in Miyazaki, Japan from 7 to 17 October 1993.

The main venue was Miyazaki Athletic Stadium, located within the Miyazaki Prefectural Sports Park.

The Sports Park had 3 track facilities and a throwing field,

including a 400m track especially built for this Championships.

The Japanese government invested $20 million to host this Championships, with a reported loss of $18 million.

The 11,475 participants reported by WMA may actually be over 12,000, more than doubling the previous highs of 4,800+ at the previous three editions of this series.

In fact it was the largest track and field meet ever held,

only the largest marathons draw more competitors.

The host country Japan alone supplied 9,901 athletes, about half of whom were marathoners.

18,000 people attended the most elaborate opening ceremonies of any Championships in this series on Saturday, 9 October.

The three-time Olympian Evelyn Ashford carried a friendship torch into the stadium to light an Olympic-style flame;

she would win the W35 200m in the competitions.

Athletes from China participated for the first time in this series, though with only a token delegation.

This edition of masters athletics Championships had a minimum age limit of 35 years for women and 40 years for men.

The governing body of this series is World Association of Veteran Athletes (WAVA). WAVA was formed during meeting at the inaugural edition of this series at Toronto in 1975, then officially founded during the second edition in 1977, then renamed as World Masters Athletics (WMA) at the Brisbane Championships in 2001.

This Championships was organized by WAVA in coordination with a Local Organising Committee (LOC) headed by Mikio Oda.

In addition to a full range of track and field events,

non-stadia events included 10K Cross Country, 10K Race Walk (women), 20K Race Walk (men), and Marathon.

South Africa
South Africa had been expelled by the International Amateur Athletic Federation (IAAF) in 1976 due to the apartheid policy of the South African government at that time.

South Africa rejoined IAAF in 1992, after the abolition of the apartheid system,

and South African athletes officially participated under their native  flag for the first time in this series.

Results
Past Championships results are archived at WMA.

Additional archives are available from Museum of Masters Track & Field

as a pdf book

and in a pdf newsletter.

Detailed results are extracted from the pdf book separately for women

and for men.

Several masters world records were set at this Championships. World records for 1993 are from the list of World Records in the Museum of Masters Track & Field pdf book unless otherwise noted.

Women

Men

References

World Masters Athletics Championships
World Masters Athletics Championships
International athletics competitions hosted by Japan
1993
Masters athletics (track and field) records